The Western Washington University Outdoor Sculpture Collection is a public sculpture collection founded in 1960. The collection contains thirty-six public sculptures spanning 190 acres of the Western Washington University campus.

History
In 1957, the board of trustees of Western Washington University established a policy that encouraged public art on the campus. The first work added to the collection, commissioned by Paul Thiry, was James Fitzgerald's Rain Forest, in 1960.

Campus architect Ibsen Nelsen commissioned Isamu Noguchi's "Skyviewing Sculpture" in the 1960s.
 
Funding for the acquisition of the works in the collection came from a combination of sources that included the state's one percent for art law, The Virginia Wright Fund, and the National Endowment for the Arts

The collection is overseen by the director of the university's Western Art Gallery. As of 2015, the director of the collection is Hafþór Yngvason.

Sculptures in the collection

"Rain Forest (1959)," by James FitzGerald
"Totem (1962)," by Norman Warsinske
"Wall Relief" (1962), by Norman Warsinske
"Scepter" (1966), by Steve Tibbetts
"Sky Viewing Sculpture" (1969), by Isamu Noguchi
"Steam Work for Bellingham-II, by Robert Morris
"Alphabeta Cube" (1972), by Fred Bassetti
"The Man Who Used to Hunt Cougars for Bounty" (1972), by Richard Beyer
"Log Ramps" (1974; 1987), by Lloyd Hamrol
"For Handel" (1975), by Mark di Suvero
"India" (1976), by Anthony Caro
"Sasquatch" (1976), by Rod Pullar
"Flank II" (1978), by Mia Westerlund Roosen
"Garapata" (1978), by John Keppelman
"Mindseye" (1978), by Mark di Suvero
"Stone Enclosure: Rock Rings" (1978), by Nancy Holt
"Curve / Diagonal" (1979), by Robert Maki
"Normanno Column" (1980), by Beverly Pepper
"Normanno Wedge" (1980), by Beverly Pepper
"Wright's Triangle" (1980), by Richard Serra
"Untitled Box" (1982), by Donald Judd
"Bayview Station" (1987), by George Trakas
"The Islands of the Rose Apple Tree Surrounded by the Oceans of the World for You, Oh My Darling" (1987), by Alice Aycock
"Two-part Chairs, Right Angle Version (A Pair)" (1987), by Scott Burton
"Untitled" (1989), by Ulrich Rückriem
"Untitled" (1990), by Meg Webster
"Manus" (1994), by Magdalena Abakanowicz
"Feats of Strength" (1999), by Tom Otterness
"Stadium Piece" (1999), by Bruce Nauman
"Bigger Big Chair" (2006), by David Ireland
"Burning Island" (2014), by Keaton Martin
"Nooksack Middle Fork" (2016), by Claude Zevas

See also
Public Art

References

External links
 Official site

1960 establishments in Washington (state)
Outdoor sculptures in Washington (state)
Sculpture collections